"Cara Mia" is a popular song published in 1954 that became a UK number 1, and US number 10 hit and Gold record for English singer David Whitfield in 1954, and a number 4 hit for the American rock group Jay and the Americans in 1965. The title means "my beloved" in Italian.

Background
The English singer David Whitfield first recorded the song with the Mantovani Orchestra in 1954. It made the charts in the United States, and in the UK was the first record to spend ten consecutive weeks at number 1 on the UK Singles Chart. Whitfield's version was one of the biggest selling British records in the pre-rock days. It sold more than three and a half million copies worldwide and was a Top 10 hit in America.

Writers
Authorship of the song was credited to Tulio Trapani (the pen name of the song's co-writer and arranger Mantovani) and Lee Lange (Bunny Lewis,  Whitfield's producer).

Jay and the Americans cover
Jay and the Americans recorded "Cara Mia" on their 1965 LP Blockbusters.  It became an international Top 5 hit, reaching number 1 in Canada. Their version was re-released in 1980, and went into the charts in the Netherlands.

Chart history

Weekly charts

Year-end charts

Other notable remakes
  
José Carreras
Richard Clayderman - included in his album Love Songs of the World (1986).
Helen Forrest - a single release in 1954.
Mario del Monaco (with Mantovani and His Orchestra)
Gordon MacRae - a single release in 1954.
The Johnny Mann Singers
Josef Locke
Jaime Morey
Frank Patterson
Måns Zelmerlöw
Gene Pitney - included in his album Golden Greats (1967).
Jack Pleis
The Raes
Nikolai Volkoff
Slim Whitman - for his album Red River Valley (1977)
Paul Delicato, a disco cover (1976) - U.S. AC #5, Canada AC #15
Gene Ammons

References

External links
 Lyrics of this song
 
 

1954 singles
1965 singles
David Whitfield songs
Jay and the Americans songs
Gene Pitney songs
RPM Top Singles number-one singles
UK Singles Chart number-one singles
United Artists Records singles
1954 songs
1950s ballads